The Khanqah of Baybars II is a medieval building located on historic Sharia Gamaliya in Cairo, Egypt. It was built in 1309, in the medieval Islamic Cairo era, to accommodate four hundred Sufis and children of the Mamluks. This is the oldest khanqah, or hostel, that has survived in modern Cairo.

Builder
Baibars al-Jashankir (Arabic: بيبرس الجاشنكير ) or Baibars II (d.1310, Cairo) (royal name: al-Malik al-Muzaffar Rukn al-Din Baibars al-Jashankir al-Mansuri; Arabic: الملك المظفر ركن الدين بيبرس الجاشنكير المنصورى) (Nickname: Abu al-Fath (Arabic: أبوالفتح)), was known as al-gashankir, "the taster", a court position he held at one point. He served as the Atabek of Egypt and after the death of Emir Salar, he became the Sultan of Egypt in 1309. He sponsored lavish decoration of the building.

Building
Within the confines of the irregular site, the various functions of the Khanqah were interwoven into an architecturally rich building complex. The elegant facade has an imposing arched entrance that projects into the street. The doorway is set back in a marble recess covered with a hood of stalactites.  A block of pharaonic stone engraved with hieroglyphics was used for the doorsill.

The minaret, capped with a ribbed dome that was once covered with green faience tiles, is located on the south side of the building. The first tier is square and trimmed with rows of stalactites, or Muqarnas vaulting, while the second is cylindrical.

See also
 Islamic Cairo
 List of Historic Monuments in Cairo

External links

 Funerary Complex of Baybars al-Jashankir at ArchNet
 Funerary Complex of Baybars al-Jashankir

Medieval Cairo
Muizz Street
1300 establishments
Buildings and structures in Cairo
Mamluk architecture in Egypt
13th-century establishments in the Mamluk Sultanate